Tosi Agapi Pos Na Hathei (Greek: Τόση Αγάπη Πως Να Χαθεί; English: So Much Love How To Get Lost) is the fifth album by Greek artist, Natasa Theodoridou. It was released on 14 November 2002 by Sony Music Greece and certified gold in a month, but after two months received platinum certification, selling 40,000 units*. The album charted for seven months and promoted seven singles. It was produced and entirely written by Cypriot songwriter, Giorgos Theofanous.

* In 2002, platinum was the album whose sales exceeded 40,000 units.

Track listing

Singles 
Seven songs becoming singles to radio stations with music videos, except the songs "Ela Pou... Fovamai" " and "Stigmi", and gained a lot of airplay.
 "Ah!" (Oh!)
 "Ela Pou... Fovamai" (Come On... I'm Scared)
 "Opou Kai Na 'Sai" (Wherever You Are)
 "Feggari" (Moon)
 "Tis Diskoles Stigmes" (The Hard Times)
 "Stigmi" (Moment)
 "Fige Apo Do" (Get Out Of Here)

Credits 
Credits adapted from liner notes.

Personnel 
Dimos Beke – backing vocals (tracks: 1, 2, 5, 6, 8, 9, 11, 12, 13, 14)
Giannis Bithikotsis – bouzouki, baglama (tracks: 2, 4, 7, 10, 13) / cura (tracks: 2, 4, 6, 10, 12, 14, 15)
Savvas Christodoulou – guitar (tracks: 2, 3, 4, 5, 6, 7, 9, 10, 12, 13, 15)
Akis Diximos – second vocal (tracks: 2, 4, 7, 10)
Katerina Kiriakou – backing vocals (tracks: 1, 2, 5, 6, 8, 9, 11, 12, 13, 14)
Giorgos Kostoglou – bass (tracks: 3, 5, 9)
Kiriakos Gkouventas – violin (tracks: 3)
Takis Mitsopoulos – drums (tracks: 3, 5, 9)
Andreas Mouzakis – drums (tracks: 2, 4, 6, 7, 10, 12, 13, 15)
Alex Panagi – backing vocals (tracks: 1, 2, 5, 6, 8, 9, 11, 12, 13, 14)
Elena Patroklou – backing vocals (tracks: 1, 2, 5, 6, 8, 9, 11, 12, 13, 14)
Giorgos Theofanous – orchestration, programming
Nikos Vardis – bass (tracks: 2, 4, 6, 7, 10, 12, 13, 15)

Production 
Vasilis Bouloubasis – hair styling
Dimitris Chorianopoulos (Workshop studio) – editing / mix engineer (tracks: 9, 10)
Giannis Doulamis – production manager
Sotiris Egkolfopoulos (Workshop studio) – sound engineer (vocals)
Giannis Ioannidis (Digital Press Hellas) – mastering
Iakovos Kalaitzakis – make up
Ilias Lakkas (Odeon studio) – mix engineer (tracks: 1, 2, 3, 4, 5, 6, 7, 8, 11, 12, 13, 14, 15) / sound engineer
Q Creation – art direction
Niovi Panagiotatou (Odeon studio) – sound engineer
Petros Siakavellas (Digital Press Hellas) – mastering
Dimitris Stamatiou (Workshop studio) – sound engineer (backing vocals)
Despina Triantafillidou – cover processing
Katerina Tsatsani – photographer

Charts 
Tosi Agapi Pos Na Hathei made its debut at number 1 on the 'Greece Top 50 Albums' charts.

References 

Natasa Theodoridou albums
Greek-language albums
2002 albums
Sony Music Greece albums